This is a list of all men, boys and women who have captained a Sri Lankan national cricket team at official international level. Sri Lanka became a full member of the International Cricket Council on 21 July 1981. Previously they were an associate member of the ICC from 1965, which made them eligible to compete in the ICC Trophy, the leading one-day tournament for associate members. Just after Sri Lanka gained Test status in 1981 a team of rebel players toured apartheid South Africa under the banner "Arosa Sri Lanka" (the term "Arosa" being derived from the promoter's name). All players who toured Sri Lanka were banned from official cricket matches for life, thereby setting Sri Lanka's development back. Sri Lanka's greatest success in One Day Internationals was when they won the Cricket World Cup in 1996 under the captaincy of Arjuna Ranatunga.

Men's cricket

Test match captains
This is a list of cricketers who have captained the Sri Lankan cricket team for at least one Test match. The table of results is complete including the first Test against Bangladesh which ended on 4 February 2018. Where a player has a dagger (†) next to a Test match series in which he captained at least one Test, that denotes that player captained this side for a minor proportion in a series.

 
Notes:
1 Asian Test Championship
² Final of the Asian Test Championship

Updated 27 March 2022

Men's One-Day International captains

This is a list of cricketers who have captained the Sri Lankan cricket team for at least one One Day International. Sri Lanka's greatest success was when they won the 1996 cricket World Cup under the captaincy of Arjuna Ranatunga.

Updated 7 September 2021

Twenty20 International captains

This is a list of cricketers who have captained the Sri Lankan cricket team for at least one Twenty20 International.

Updated: 12 September 2022

ICC Trophy

The ICC Trophy is the leading one-day tournament from non-Test teams, and Sri Lanka participated in the tournament before they gained Test status. This is a list of the men who captained Sri Lanka in the ICC Trophy.

Other Men's captains

Rebel tours to South Africa
In October and November 1982 a group of Sri Lankan cricketers went on a private tour of apartheid South Africa. It was the first time a tour comprising all non-white cricketers had toured white South Africa (a team of Kenyan Asians had previously visited the black areas of South Africa, and the International Wanderers XI and DH Robins' XI that had toured in the 1970s included a small number of non-white players). They played under the banner "Arosa Sri Lanka", the "Arosa" bit coming from their promoters. All players were banned from cricket for life as a result.

The Arosa Sri Lanka team was captained by Bandula Warnapura. They were soundly beaten in the two rebel Tests and four rebel ODIs that they played against the full South African cricket team.

Women's cricket

Test match captains

This is a list of cricketers who have captained the Sri Lankan women's cricket team for at least one women's Test match. Sri Lanka have played only one women's Test.

Women's One-Day International captains

This is a list of cricketers who have captained the Sri Lankan women's cricket team for at least one women's one-day international. The table of results is complete to the women's ODI against South Africa in the World Cup in 2004/5. Sri Lanka have never reached the semi-final stage in women's World Cups.

Women's Twenty20International captains

Youth cricket

Test match captains

This is a list of cricketers who have captained the Sri Lankan Under-19 cricket team for at least one under-19 Test match. The table of results is complete to the second "Test" against Pakistan in 2004/5. Where a player has a dagger (†) next to a Test match series in which he captained at least one Test, that denotes that player was captain for a minor proportion in a series. The very nature of Under-19 cricket means that in practice no youth captains the side for more than one year.

Youth One-Day International captains

This is a list of cricketers who have captained the Sri Lankan Under-19 cricket team for at least one Under-19 One Day International. The table of results is complete to the end of the 2005/6 Afro-Asia Cup. Sri Lanka's best result in the Under-19 World Cup was as runners-up in 1999/2000 under the captaincy of Malintha Gajanayake.

See also
 List of international cricket grounds in Sri Lanka

References
CricketArchive
Cricinfo
Wisden Cricketers' Almanack

Notes

Captains
National
Sri Lanka